Vladimír Hartinger (born July 16, 1979 in Šternberk) is a Czech professional ice hockey player. He was formerly a member of the Huntsville Havoc in Huntsville, Alabama, and helped the team to win the Southern Professional Hockey League championship in 2009–10. Then later played in Rapid City, South Dakota for the Rapid City Rush in the Central Hockey League. Vladimir Hartinger has been involved with the sport of hockey from a young age.  He played with the Czech National team as well as the Czech Army team as a young adult.  Hartinger played professional hockey for the CHL, SPHL, and an international league from 2001 - 2011.  Vladimir has been coaching youth hockey in New Mexico since leaving professional hockey.  He is passionate about helping youth players develop not only as high level competitive players, but also as teammates and responsible young adults.

He also coaches youth ice hockey in New Mexico and Missouri.

Career statistics

Awards and honours

References

External links

1979 births
Czech ice hockey defencemen
Fort Worth Brahmas players
HC Kometa Brno players
HC Prostějov players
Huntsville Havoc players
Living people
New Mexico Scorpions (CHL) players
Rapid City Rush players
Wichita Thunder players
People from Šternberk
Sportspeople from the Olomouc Region
Czech expatriate ice hockey players in the United States
Czech emigrants to the United States
Czech expatriate sportspeople in Italy
Expatriate ice hockey players in Italy
Czech ice hockey coaches